Bhindi Bazaar Inc is a 2011 Indian Hindi-language crime thriller film. It's stars Kay Kay Menon, Prashant Narayanan, Gautham K. Sharma and supporting with Pawan Malhotra, Piyush Mishra and Jackie Shroff. Directed by Ankush Bhatt and produced by Karan Arora, the film released on 17 June 2011.

Plot
Based in Bhindi Bazar, Mumbai, Mamu is a gangster, who leads a gang of men and women who pick pockets of civilians on busy streets and over-crowded BEST buses. His wife, Bano, manages all household work, and after getting overwhelmed, gets her cousin, Shabana, to re-locate and live with them. Bano soon finds that the latter is more interested in her husband but is unable to assert herself. After a steamy bout of intimacy with Shabana, Mamu's heart fails and he passes away. A power struggle ensues - with a rival, Shankar Pandey, deciding to get more assertive - resulting in a gang-war. Amidst a rapidly spreading influenza virus, Fateh decides to take over the reins from Mamu, while Shabana takes an active interest in the former as well as makes plans for a seemingly helpless and widowed Bano.

Cast
Kay Kay Menon As Shroff
Prashant Narayanan As Fateh
Gautham K. Sharma As Tezz/Tabrez
Pawan Malhotra As Mamu
Shilpa Shukla As Kanjri
Sweta Verma As Simran
Deepti Naval As Baano
Vedita Pratap Singh As Shabana
Piyush Mishra As Shankar Panday
Jackie Shroff As Narcotics Officer.
Caterina Lopez as a Singer/Dancer in the song "Taan Ke Seena".

Soundtrack

External links

References

2011 films
Hindi-language thriller films